The Illawarra Light Railway Museum operates a mainline  narrow gauge light railway, a miniature  gauge railway, and a museum located near Albion Park Rail near Wollongong, south of Sydney

History 

The Illawarra Light Railway Museum Society Ltd. was started in 1972 with railway operations commencing in 1974 dedicated to preserving Light Railway history & Illawarra industrial history. In 2007 the society obtained federal funding for the construction of the Ken McCarthy Museum Building, which was officially opened in December 2007.

Operations
The Museum is opened on 
Work Days being Tuesdays, Thursdays.
Running Days every second Sunday and Forth Saturday of each month.

The museum site consist of the following features:

Yallah Station Building
Otford Signal Box
Fettlers Shed
Souvenir Shop & Kiosk
Workshop and Locomotive & Carriage Storage Shed
Ken McCarthy Museum Building
Arthur Moore Stationary Engine Display

Exhibits

Apart from the wooden trams, the horse-drawn wagon of the Dry Creek explosives depot near Adelaide is particularly noteworthy.

Gallery

See also 

 List of heritage railways in Australia

References

External links 
 www.ilrms.com.au (Official Website)

2 ft gauge railways in Australia
Railway museums in New South Wales
Steam museums
Technology museums in Australia
Tourist railways in New South Wales